Zhaleh may refer to:
 Jale (disambiguation)
 Zhaleh-ye Kuseh, a village in Iran